The women's hammer throw at the 2022 Commonwealth Games, as part of the athletics programme, took place in the Alexander Stadium on 4 and 6 August 2022.

Records
Prior to this competition, the existing world and Games records were as follows:

Schedule
The schedule was as follows:

All times are British Summer Time (UTC+1)

Results

Qualification
Across one groups, those who threw ≥68.00 m (Q) or at least the 12 best performers (q) advanced to the final.

Final
The medals were determined in the final.

References

Women's hammer throw
2022
2022 in women's athletics